Enderle is a German surname.

Notable people with this surname include:
 August Enderle (1887–1959), German politician
 Dick Enderle (1947–2008), American football player
 Irmgard Enderle (1895–1985), German politician
 Nathan Enderle (born 1988), American football player
 Rob Enderle (born 1954), American technology analyst
 Sebastian Enderle (born 1989), German footballer